The Indian locomotive class WCM-6 is a class of 1.5 kV DC electric locomotives that was developed in 1995 by Chittaranjan Locomotive Works (CLW) for Indian Railways. The model name stands for broad gauge (W), Direct Current (C), Mixed traffic (M) engine, 6th generation (6). They entered service in 1996. A total of 2 WCM-6 locomotives was built at CLW in 1995. Currently they haul only departmental trains and do shunting duties.

History 
The history of WCM-6 begins in the early 1960s with the stated aim of the Indian Railways (IR) to remove the aging fleet of WCM class locomotives working in the Central Railways (CR). So IR to procure 2 1500 V DC electric locomotives from Chittaranjan Locomotive Works (CLW), who also previously supplied the WCM-5 class. They had the High Adhesion Bogies used in the WAG-7 class AC locomotive.

They are manufactured in India in 1995. They were the first “non nosed” DC locomotives  to be manufactured.

WCM-6 class DC locomotives of Kalyan shed and were converted to work on 25KV AC by Electric Locomotives Works -Bhusuwal on 28 August 2008. The WCM-6 locomotives were used in Freight Duties.

Locomotive shed

Former sheds 
 Ajni
Bhusuwal (BSL)

See also 

 Rail transport in India#History
 Indian Railways
 Locomotives of India
 Rail transport in India

References

External links 

 http://www.irfca.org/faq/faq-specs.html#WCM-6
 
 India railway fan club

Electric locomotives of India
1500 V DC locomotives
Co-Co locomotives
Railway locomotives introduced in 1961
5 ft 6 in gauge locomotives
Chittaranjan Locomotive Works locomotives